Cancionera (English title: Singer) is a Mexican telenovela produced by Guillermo Diazayas for Televisa in 1980.

Cast 
Norma Herrera as Norma
Manuel Ojeda as Hector Raúl
July Furlong as Paloma
Rosario Gálvez as Amparo
Liza Willert as Matilde
Raúl Meráz as Bruno
Luis Uribe as Alberto
Miguel Suárez as Grandfather
Gloria Marin as Emilia
Miguel Angel Sanroman as Alfonso
Carlos Pouliot as Maestro
Norma Flores as Estela
Irlanda Mora as Tania
Rolando de Castro as Enrique
Gustavo del Castillo as Sergio
Sergio Esquivel as Sergio
Arturo Benavides as Vázquez
Sergio Milina as Producer
Juan José Illescas as Doctor
Alejandra Peniche as Josefina

References

External links 

Mexican telenovelas
1980 telenovelas
Televisa telenovelas
Spanish-language telenovelas
1980 Mexican television series debuts
1980 Mexican television series endings